Ratua, situated in the Vanuatu archipelago, is a  island located south of Espiritu Santo, between Aore and Malo islands.

History
In the early 1900s, during the Anglo-French condominium colony, when the Vanuatu archipelago was originally named New Hebrides until its independence in 1980, the island of Ratua was an uninhabited French coconut plantation where copra was produced.

Geography
The island is a rich sanctuary of flora and fauna, from active volcanoes, waterfalls, caves, reefs inhabited by sea tortoises and bright coral reefs, it is still covered by a plethora of flamboyant coconut and fruit trees.

Resort
In 2005, the island of Ratua became the property of a French nature lover who established a private resort which encapsulates the patrimonial association of nature preservation. The resort has adopted an "eco-friendly" philosophy, offering dynamic natural resources as well as employing local inhabitants of the island in order to grow and sustain their economy.

Sources

External links
  
 
 Official website - Ratua

Islands of Vanuatu
Private islands of Oceania
Sanma Province
Resorts in Vanuatu